Casiguran, officially the Municipality of Casiguran (Tagalog/Kasiguranin: Bayan ng Casiguran), is a 2nd class municipality in the province of Aurora, Philippines. According to the 2020 census, it has a population of 26,564 people.

The municipality is home to the Amro River Protected Landscape.

Etymology
According to folk legend, the name Casiguran was obtained from the Ilocano term Sigod which means "edge" or "maximum", which is due to the location of the Municipality at the northern edge of Aurora Province. (Another translation & definition of sigod is "soon" or "early") Another legend says that if an unmarried stranger comes to the place, he unavoidably falls in love and marries and most of the time stays for good. The affixation of sigod when converting it to a noun is kasigudan, from which the Hispanized pronunciation "Casiguran" is derived.

History
Casiguran was founded by Spanish missionaries on June 13, 1609. Prior to their arrival, early settlers were the Dumagats, Aetas, and Bugkalots followed by migrants from other parts of the Philippines. These migrants spoke different languages such as Ilocano, Visayan languages, Tagalog, Bikol languages, Kapampangan, Gaddang, Itawis and Ibanag, and from these a Kasiguranin dialect evolved. Casiguran was then part of the province of Nueva Vizcaya.

In 1902, Casiguran became part of the province of Tayabas (now Quezon).< From 1906 to 1907, Casiguran was merged with the town of Baler, also then in Tayabas.

In 1942, invading Japanese forces landed in the town of Casiguran. On February 19, 1945 to May 11, 1945, Allied troops as well as Philippine Commonwealth forces and recognized guerrilla units fought on the Battle of Casiguran during the return of American forces on Luzon on World War II. When the Philippines regained sovereignty in 1946, Aurora was still part of Tayabas and Casiguran was a lone northern town. Its political jurisdiction is bounded on the north by the province of Isabela, on the west by Quirino, and on the south west by Barangay Dinadiawan, which was then the boundary between Baler and Casiguran.

In 1959 and 1966, the barrios of Dilasag and Dinalungan, which were part of Casiguran and situated on its northern and south-western portions, were made into municipalities.

On August 2, 1968, the 7.6-magnitude 1968 Casiguran earthquake struck near Casiguran.

Geography
According to the Philippine Statistics Authority, the municipality has a land area of  constituting  of the  total area of Aurora.

It is bounded on the north-east by Dilasag, south-west by Dinalungan, north-west by Quirino and southeast by the Philippine Sea.

Barangays
Casiguran is politically subdivided into 24 barangays.

Climate

Demographics

In the 2020 census, Casiguran had a population of 26,564.

In 1960, the population of Casiguran was 6,900. This was almost doubled by the 1970s when population was 12,128, an increase of about 76% (5.8% annual average growth rate). Between 1970 and 1975, there was a marked decreased in the number of population from 12,128 to 11,670. This reduction was due to deteriorated peace and order, which forced some of the population to move away. The trend reversed by 1980, with an increase of 19% or an annual average growth rate increase of 3.86%. Increasing population continued during the succeeding censal years (1980 to 1995) but with a declining annual average population growth rate. This is attributed to the gradual stoppage of logging operations in the area. Many workers involved in this trade were not original residents, so when the jobs were no longer available, they left. Between 1995 and 1999 there was a significant increase of the annual average population growth rate to 4.36%.

Economy

Notable personalities
Athena Imperial - news field reporter, communication researcher and Miss Philippines Earth 2011.

See also
 1968 Casiguran earthquake

References

External links

 [ Philippine Standard Geographic Code]
 Casiguran

Municipalities of Aurora (province)